Llan-dafel (also referred to as Llandafal) is a village in the community of Cwm, in the Ebbw Valley in Blaenau Gwent.

The A4046 runs near to the village.

Geography 
The area is the location of the Aberbeeg Enduro Track (motocross track), a track site designated as legal by Blaenau Gwent Borough Council.

The area is not to be confused with Tai Calon Community Housing's Ebbw Vale Llandafal Court site in Ebbw Vale, a Supported Living scheme built in 1989 on part of the former Dyffryn School site.

Transport 

The town's Waterloo Terrace stop is on the route between Newport and Ebbw Vale/Tredegar which provides connections to Stagecoach South Wales services:

 98 (Ebbw Vale-Abertillery/Brynmawr)
 E3 (Ebbw Vale-Brynmawr)
 62 (Ebbw Vale-Cwmbran)

Governance 
The Llan-dafel electoral ward serves the village. The ward is represented by Councillors Derrick Bevan (Cwm, Lab) and Gareth Leslie Davies (Cwm, PC).

The area is represented in the Senedd by Alun Davies (Labour) and the Member of Parliament is Nick Smith (Labour).

References

External links 
 Llan-dafel at Wales Directory

Villages in Blaenau Gwent